The 2001–02 Eredivisie season was the 42nd season of the Eredivisie in basketball, the highest professional basketball league in the Netherlands. Ricoh Astronauts won their 4th national title.

Regular season

Playoffs 

Dutch Basketball League seasons
Netherlands
1